The women's tournament of the 2014 M&M Meat Shops Canadian Junior Curling Championships was held from January 18 to 26 at the Queens Place Emera Centre and the Liverpool Curling Club.

Teams
The teams are listed as follows:

Round-robin standings
Final Standings

Round-robin results
All draw times are listed in Atlantic Standard Time (UTC−4).

Pool A

Draw 1
Saturday, January 18, 9:30 am

Draw 2
Saturday, January 18, 2:00 pm

Draw 3
Saturday, January 18, 7:30 pm

Draw 4
Sunday, January 19, 9:30 am

Draw 5
Sunday, January 19, 2:00 pm

Draw 6
Sunday, January 19, 6:30 pm

Draw 8
Monday, January 20, 2:00 pm

Draw 9
Monday, January 20, 6:30 pm

Draw 10
Tuesday, January 21, 9:30 am

Draw 11
Tuesday, January 21, 2:00 pm

Pool B

Draw 1
Saturday, January 18, 9:30 am

Draw 2
Saturday, January 18, 2:00 pm

Draw 3
Saturday, January 18, 7:30 pm

Draw 4
Sunday, January 19, 9:30 am

Draw 5
Sunday, January 19, 2:00 pm

Draw 6
Sunday, January 19, 6:30 pm

Draw 7
Monday, January 20, 9:30 am

Draw 8
Monday, January 20, 2:00 pm

Draw 9
Monday, January 20, 6:30 pm

Draw 10
Tuesday, January 21, 9:30 am

Pool A Tie-Breaker
Tuesday, January 21, 6:30 pm

Placement Round

Seeding Pool

Standings
Final Standings

Draw 1
Tuesday, January 21, 6:30 pm

Draw 2
Wednesday, January 22, 9:30 am

Draw 3
Wednesday, January 22, 6:30 pm

Draw 4
Thursday, January 23, 6:30 pm

Draw 5
Friday, January 24, 12:30 pm

Championship Pool

Championship Pool Standings
Final Standings

Draw 1

Wednesday, January 22, 9:30 am

Draw 2

Wednesday, January 22, 2:00 pm

Draw 3

Wednesday, January 22, 6:30 pm

Draw 4

Thursday, January 23, 9:30 am

Draw 5
Thursday, January 23, 2:00 pm

Draw 6
Thursday, January 23, 6:30 pm

Draw 7
Friday, January 24, 8:00 am

Playoffs

Semifinal
Saturday, January 25, 9:30 am

Final
Saturday, January 25, 4:00 pm

Awards
The all-star teams and award winners are as follows:

All-Star Teams
Women
First Team
Skip:  Kelsey Rocque, Alberta 79%
Third:  Marika Van Osch, British Columbia 81%
Second:  Sarah Daniels, British Columbia 80%
Lead:  Karlee Korchinski, Saskatchewan 82%

Second Team
Skip:  Mary Fay, Nova Scotia 73%
Third:  Amy Heitzner, Ontario 77%
Second:  Karlee Burgess, Nova Scotia 76%
Lead:  Ashley Sanderson, British Columbia 80%

Men
First Team
Skip:  Carter Lautner, Alberta 80%
Third:  Michael Brophy, Nova Scotia 80%
Second:  Lucas Van Den Bosch, Manitoba 81%
Lead:  Jason Olsthoorn, Quebec 81%

Second Team
Skip:  Ryan McCrady, Manitoba 77%
Third:  Daniel Wenzek, New Brunswick 79%
Second:  David Aho, Alberta 79%
Lead:  Cole Lyon-Hatcher, Ontario 81%

Ken Watson Sportsmanship Awards
Women
 Patty Wallingham, Yukon second
Men
 Taylor Ardriel, Alberta third

Fair Play Awards
Women
Lead:  Hilary Charlie, Northwest Territories
Second:  Danielle Lafleur, Manitoba
Third:  Abby Ackland, Manitoba
Skip:  Carina McKay-Saturnino, Northwest Territories
Coach:  Dale McEwen, Manitoba

Men
Lead:  Deklen Crocker, Northwest Territories
Second:  Alex Sutherland, Prince Edward Island
Third:  Connor Faulkner, Nunavut
Skip:  Rene Comeau, New Brunswick
Coach:  Tom Clasper, Manitoba

ASHAM National Coaching Awards
Women
 Nick Saturnino, Northwest Territories
Men
 Tom Clasper, Manitoba

Joan Mead Legacy Awards
Women
 Cathlia Ward, New Brunswick Third
Men
 Cole Lyon-Hatcher, Ontario Lead

References

External links

Junior Championships
Canadian Junior Curling Championships, 2014
Region of Queens Municipality
Canadian Junior Curling Championships
2014 in Nova Scotia